The 11th Louisiana Infantry Regiment was a unit of foot soldiers from Louisiana that fought in the Confederate States Army during the American Civil War. The regiment fought at Belmont in 1861 and Island Number Ten, Shiloh, and Corinth in 1862. By this time its numbers were seriously reduced, so the regiment was disbanded in August 1862. The survivors mostly transferred to the 13th Louisiana and 20th Louisiana Infantry Regiments, but a few soldiers became part of the 14th Louisiana Sharpshooter Battalion.

Notes

References

 

Units and formations of the Confederate States Army from Louisiana
1861 establishments in Louisiana
Military units and formations established in 1861
1862 disestablishments in Louisiana
Military units and formations disestablished in 1862